Marjolein is a Dutch feminine given name. It probably originated as an extension of the name Maria, guided to be identical to the Dutch name for marjoram. A less common spelling is Marjolijn. People with this name include:

Marjolein
Marjolein Bastin (born 1943), Dutch nature artist, writer, children's author and illustrator
Marjolein Beumer (born 1966), Dutch actress
Marjolein Buis (born 1988), Dutch wheelchair tennis player
Marjolein Decroix (born 1992), Beligan alpine skier
Marjolein Delno (born 1994), Dutch swimmer
Marjolein Dijkstra (born 1967), Dutch physicist
Marjolein Eijsvogel (born 1961),  Dutch field hockey player
Marjolein Faber (born 1960), Dutch politician
Marjolein van't Geloof (born 1996), Dutch racing cyclist
Marjolein de Jong (born 1968), Dutch volleyball player
 (born 1962), Dutch singer, actor and presenter
Marjolein Kooijman (born 1980), Dutch bass guitarist
Marjolein Kriek (born 1973), Dutch clinical geneticist
Marjolein Lindemans (born 1994), Belgian haptahtlete
Marjolein Lips-Wiersma, New Zealand business ethics academic
Marjolein Tambayong (1937-2022), Indonesian actress
Marjolein van der Meulen (born 1965), American biomedical engineer
 (born 1962), Dutch judoka
Marjolijn
Marjolijn Both (born 1971), Dutch synchronized swimmer 
Marjolijn Februari pseudonym of Maxim Februari (born 1963), Dutch writer, philosopher and columnist
Marjolijn Hof (born 1956), Dutch writer
Marjolijn Molenaar (born 1983), Dutch cricketer
Marjolijn Verspoor (born 1952), Dutch professor of English

References

Dutch feminine given names